Echinolittorina feejeensis is a species of sea snail, a marine gastropod mollusk in the family Littorinidae, the winkles or periwinkles.

Description

Distribution

References

 Williams S.T. & Reid D.G. (2004). Speciation and diversity on tropical rocky shores: a global phylogeny of snails of the genus Echinolittorina. Evolution 58(10): 2227–2251
 Reid D.G. (2007). The genus Echinolittorina Habe, 1956 (Gastropoda: Littorinidae) in the Indo-West Pacific Ocean. Zootaxa 1420

Littorinidae
Gastropods described in 1857